Gaston Gallimard (18 January 1881 – 25 December 1975) was a French publisher.

He founded La Nouvelle Revue Française in 1908, together with André Gide and Jean Schlumberger.
In 1911 the trio established La Nouvelle Revue Française. In 1919, he created his own publishing house, named Librairie Gallimard, though he continued to work closely with the NRF. Éditions Gallimard is one of the leading French publishing houses.

In  World War II during the German occupation of Paris a "round-table" of French and German intellectuals met at the Georges V Hotel including Gallimard, the writers Ernst Junger, Paul Morand, Jean Cocteau, and Henry Millon de Montherlant and the legal scholar Carl Schmitt.

Gallimard, in October 1932, founded the Marianne (magazine: 1932-40).

Works

Texts by Gaston Gallimard 
 Friedrich Hebbel, Judith, five-act tragedy translated from German by Gaston Gallimard & Pierre de Lanux. Paris, Éditions de la Nouvelle Revue française, 1911.
 « Il a inventé des auteurs, un public », En souvenir de René Julliard, Paris, René Julliard, 1963, .

Correspondences 
 Jean Paulhan / Gaston Gallimard, Correspondance, edition established, presented and annotated by Laurence Brisset, Gallimard, 2011.
 Marcel Proust / Gaston Gallimard, Correspondance, edition, presented and annotated by Pascal Fouché, Paris, Gallimard, 1989.
 Jacques Rivière / Gaston Gallimard, Correspondance 1911-1924, edition, presented and annotated by Pierre-Edmond Robert in collaboration with Alain Rivière, Paris, 1881

Bibliography 
 Pierre Assouline, Gaston Gallimard : Un demi-siècle d’édition française, Balland, 1984, Folio, 2006
 Catalogue Gallimard. 1911-2011, 1711 p.
 Gallimard. Un siècle d'édition, Bibliothèque nationale de France/Gallimard, 2011
 , Gallimard. Un éditeur à l'œuvre, Gallimard, 2011, series "Découvertes Gallimard" #569

References

External links 
 Gaston Gallimard on Babelio
 Gaston Gallimard on Encyclopædia Britannica
 Gallimard: 100 years in publishing on The Guardian (26 March 2011)

1881 births
1975 deaths
Businesspeople from Paris
French book publishers (people)
Lycée Condorcet alumni
Nouvelle Revue Française editors
Gaston